The term architectural designer may refer to a building designer who is not a registered architect, architectural technologist or any other person that is involved in the design process of buildings or urban landscapes.

Architectural designers may not hold the same degree qualification and are generally not recognised by a statutory body. Depending on the jurisdiction, limitations may exist in project size and scope that an architectural designer is permitted to perform services for without direct supervision from a registered architect. Independent architectural designers generally work on projects that are within these limitations.

Often, building designers who have not registered as architects are referred to as architectural designers, as this term is not protected by statute in many countries. However, in many countries around the world, the term architectural designer and the derivatives of architecture are legally reserved for registered architects.

See also

 Landscape architecture
 Urban design
 Building design

References

External links
 Architectural Designers New Zealand

Architecture occupations
Design occupations
Architectural design